Bagalkot Junction railway station (station code: BGK) is a railway station in the Hubli railway division of South Western Railway in Bagalkote district, Karnataka, India. The station lies on the Gadag–Hotgi railway line, which serves Bagalkote and nearby towns with 3 platforms and was converted from meter gauge to broad gauge in December 2008.  A new line is being constructed between Bagalkote and Kudachi. Railway stations have amenities such as a computerized reservation office, waiting room, retiring room book stall. It is a B category railway station.

Developments

Proposed doubling & electrification works for Gadag–Kudagi–Hotgi section 
Gadag–Hotgi railway line doubling is sanctioned in the year 2014–15 with part of length of this project, i.e. from Hotgi to Kudgi (134 km) is taken up under Customer funding model and for this purpose National Thermal Power Corporation deposited an amount of Rs.946 cr with Indian Railways.
New crossing station at Kudgi with 4 lines for giving sideline connectivity to 4000 MW Super Thermal Power Plant was commissioned on 29.01.2017.
Work is under progress in the Hotgi–Kudagi section. The stretch between Minchinal and Lachyan (42.5 km) is targeted for commissioning during 2017–18.

Gadag–Hotgi section is also sanctioned for electrification and tenders are floated for the same.

Proposed new line project 
A new railway branch line of 142 km is being constructed from Bagalkot to Kudachi via Kajjidoni (Khajjidoni) which was sanctioned in the year 2010–2011 with an anticipated cost of 986.30 cr on 50:50 cost sharing basis and land free of cost by Government of Karnataka. The section between Bagalkot and Kajjidoni has been completed and CRS inspection between Bagalkot–Khajdoni (30 km) was done on 14.06.2017. And a rail bus is running between Bagalkot–Khajjidoni 5 days a week from Mondays to Thursdays except Saturdays & Sundays. Further work can be taken up on acquisition of land by State Government.

Major trains 
Trains those run through/from Bagalkot are:
 Gol Gumbaz Express
 Mumbai CSMT–Gadag Express*
 Basava Express
 Hubballi–Secunderabad Express
 Hubballi–Varanasi Weekly Express
 Mumbai CSMT–Gadag Express
 Hubballi–Lokmanya Tilak Terminus Express (via Bijapur)
 Yesvantpur–Barmer AC Express
 Yesvantpur–Bikaner Express
 Solapur–Hubballi Intercity Express
 Mysore–Sainagar Shirdi Express
 Solapur–Gadag DEMU Passenger
 Solapur–Dharwad Passenger
 Vijayapur–Hubballi Passenger
 Bagalkot–Khajjidoni Rail bus

References 

Hubli railway division
Railway stations in Bagalkot district